Paper Moon is a Canadian indie rock band formed in 2000 in Winnipeg, that has released three albums and an EP. Their songs have been featured in over 20 films and television series, such as Degrassi, Radio Free Roscoe, Queer as Folk, Falcon Beach, Party of Five, and Departures.

History 
The band was formed from the ashes of former Winnipeg bands B'ehl, The Bonaduces and The Electrosonics. Singer-keyboardist-guitarist Heather Campbell moved from Vancouver to Winnipeg to join three musicians who had played together in B'ehl: Allison Shevernoha, Bob Somers, and Chris Hiebert. They played their first show in May 2001, and released their first album, One Thousand Reasons To Stay, One Reason To Leave, in June 2002. The album was released on Endearing Records in Canada and on Quince Records in Japan, where the album had more sales than in the band's native country. Tracks from the album received airplay on campus radio and on CBC Radio. Paper Moon underwent major changes in its membership following Shevernoha's divorce from Somers, and then Campbell's departure to focus on working at the Endearing records label. Rob Rodgers and John Wilson joined the band; Nicole Pielou was added as they were finishing recording their second album. Leslie Oldham was recruited as well, bringing the band to six members in 2006. 

In February 2006, the band released their second album, Broken Hearts Break Faster Every Day,  under the Endearing Records label. It was nominated for a 2006 Western Canadian Music Award, for Outstanding Pop Recording. In 2009, the band released its third album, Only During Thunderstorms. The Edmonton Journal wrote that the band has "a mile-long track record for being one of the catchiest pop bands in Canada".

Paper Moon has also appeared on Intercontinental Pop Exchange No. 2, a split EP with Swedish band The Leslies, and on the children's compilation Somebody Needs a Timeout. Their musical influences include The Cardigans, Ivy, and Metric.  

In 2012, the band September West was formed with current and past members of Paper Moon.

Members

Current members 
 Allison Shevernoha - Lead Vocals, Guitar, Keyboards
 Chris Hiebert - Drums
 John Wilson - Guitar
 Nikki Taylor - Keyboards, Guitar
 Ken Phillips - Bass

Former members 
 Leslie Oldham - Vocals, Synth
 Rob Rodgers - Bass, Vocals, acting CEO.
 Nicole Pielou - Synthesizer, Vocals
 Robb Johannes - Guitar
 Heather Campbell - Synthesizer, Vocals, Guitar
 Bob Somers - Bass, Vocals
 Ryan Worsley - Bass, Guitars
 Alana Worsley - Keyboards, Vocals.

Discography 
 One Thousand Reasons To Stay, One Reason To Leave - 2002
 Intercontinental Pop Exchange No. 2 - 2003 (Split EP with The Leslies).
 Broken Hearts Break Faster Everyday - 2006
 Only During Thunderstorms - 2009

References
Citations

External links 
 September West official site
 Paper Moon official site
 Paper Moon biography at allmusic
 Endearing Records
 Bolton, Rob. “One Thousand Reasons to Stay…One Reason to Leave”. Exclaim.ca. .  Accessed August 4, 2008.
 CBC Radio 3. “Paper Moon”. https://web.archive.org/web/20100713032351/http://radio3.cbc.ca/.  Accessed August 4, 2008.
 France, Kim. “Feminism Amplified”. The Rock History Reader.  Ed. Theo Cateforis New York: Routledge, 2007.

Musical groups established in 2000
Musical groups from Winnipeg
Canadian indie rock groups
2000 establishments in Manitoba